Sør-Bindalen or Sørbindalen is a former administrative entity in the Namdalen district of Trøndelag, Norway.  It was in existence from 1658 to 1852.  It is located in the present-day municipality of Bindal in Nordland county.

History
The ancient district of Bindalen belonged to Namdalen. However, in 1658, when the county (län) of Trondheim was ceded to Sweden in the Treaty of Roskilde, the status of the border district was ambiguous, with residents paying some taxes to Helgeland, in Nordland, and some to Namdalen. The decision was then made to redraw the county boundary to run down the fjord, assigning the northern part, Nord-Bindalen, to Nordland county, which remained in the Kingdom of Denmark-Norway, while the larger part remained in Trondheim county and became Sør-Bindalen and part of the Kingdom of Sweden. The two remained separate after Trøndelag county was reunited with Norway in 1660.

In 1815, a single parish of Bindalen was created from the larger parish of Brønnø, despite the secular division of the community.  Although the 1838 formannskapsdistrikt law divided the country into municipalities which were supposed to correspond to the church parishes, the parish of Bindalen (which straddled the county border) remained as the two separate municipalities of  Nord-Bindalen and Sør-Bindalen.

References

Bindal